Leucogaster is a fungal genus in the family Albatrellaceae. The genus, widespread in northern temperate regions, contains about 20 truffle-like species. Some, such as L. rubescens, are edible.

References

Russulales
Russulales genera